Donovan Eaton Alexander (born April 3, 1985) is a former professional Canadian football defensive back. He was drafted by the Montreal Alouettes in the third round of the 2007 CFL Draft. He was signed by the Seattle Seahawks as an undrafted free agent in 2008 and upon his release, signed with the Alouettes that same year. He later played for the Saskatchewan Roughriders for two seasons and the Edmonton Eskimos for three before signing with Winnipeg. In 2012, he was named a West All-Star with the Eskimos. He played college football at North Dakota. He retired in November, 2014.

Personal life
He was born to Derek and Marilyn Alexander. He also has 2 older brother, Wyatt and David. Donovan started playing football when he was 9 years old. Football wasn't the only sport he was interested in as he loved to play basketball as well. The first football team he played for was the Charleswood Broncos.  He played high school football for the St. Paul Crusaders of Winnipeg. In college Donovan studied communications which entailed conflict resolution, media broadcasting and interpersonal communication. He is now pursuing a career as an educator at École Leila North Middle School, in Winnipeg Manitoba. He coached their grade 8 girls basketball team until 2022. Donovan is now happily married to his wife Jennifer and has 2 kids Lincoln and Yvette (Ivy) Alexander.

References

External links
Winnipeg Blue Bombers' bio
North Dakota Fighting Sioux bio

1985 births
Living people
Canadian football defensive backs
Edmonton Elks players
Montreal Alouettes players
Players of Canadian football from Manitoba
Saskatchewan Roughriders players
Seattle Seahawks players
Canadian football people from Winnipeg
North Dakota Fighting Hawks football players
Winnipeg Blue Bombers players